The National Federation of Priests' Councils (NFPC) is an organization representing more than 26,000 Catholic priests in the United States through 125 member councils, associations and religious communities. The NFPC supports member organizations and priests through collaboration, communication, ongoing formation, research and advocacy.  Formed in 1968 soon after the Second Vatican Council, the NFPC was the first national forum for local priests' councils.

Collaboration
The NFPC has partnered with religious and lay organizations including the Duke University Center for Excellence in Ministry and the Emerging Models of Pastoral Leadership project.  The goal of these collaborations is to research, publish and dialog about contemporary models of pastoral and parish leadership.

Research
The organization has sponsored several significant research projects on the priesthood, including:
 Explores the experience of early priesthood based on a survey of recently ordained priests, some active and some who have resigned.
 Analysis of a 2001 national survey of priests, including trends from previous surveys in 1970 and 1993.
 Examines whether the Catholic Church in the United States should bring in more international priests, and if so, how this should be done.
  A profile of priest compensation including retirement, tax issues and trends.

Advocacy
The NFPC was formed on May 20, 1968. The next day, the new organization made a public statement in support of the Poor People's Campaign that was underway in Washington, DC.  The NFPC has continued to advocate on issues affecting social justice and priestly life.

References

Catholic priesthood
Christian organizations based in the United States
Religious organizations based in Chicago
Catholic organizations established in the 20th century
Christian organizations established in 1968
1968 establishments in the United States